Novarama Technology is a Spanish video game developer based in Barcelona, Catalonia, Spain. It is notable for its Invizimals video game series.

History
The studio was founded in July 2003 with the mission statement of creating innovative games with mass appeal. The studio began developing PC games, releasing Fallen Lords: Condemnation on Christmas 2005 through a local publisher. Moving into the console space, Novarama began developing Wild Summer for the PC and Xbox 360. The game was cancelled due to a publisher restructuring. Surviving the crisis with just a small core team, Novarama released Music Monstars for the Nintendo DS (known as Monster Band in the USA) in Christmas 2008, a music title for young gamers.

Novarama's most well known project is the augmented reality based Invizimals franchise, published by Sony Computer Entertainment Europe, where players need to hunt for invisible monsters around the house with the aid of a PSP and a camera, which makes them visible. The game was announced at E3 2009, showing the first game trailer and a playable demo.
Invizimals was released in November 2009 across PAL territories, receiving generally positive reviews that highlighted the innovative gameplay and technology, and becoming one of the best-selling PSP games of the Christmas 2009 season across Europe.
Invizimals has spawned a sequel, Invizimals: Shadow Zone, released in 2010, as well as several product lines including toys and collectible stickers.

A second sequel to Invizimals, entitled Invizimals: The Lost Tribes was announced in June 2011 for a fall release. This announcement coincided on the same day as Sony Computer Entertainment Europe announced their exclusivity agreement to all of Novarama's games in the future.

After Invizimals: The Lost Tribes, Novarama developed Reality Fighters, a PS Vita launch title. Reality Fighters is an augmented reality fighting game backed by a powerful character editor. By taking a photo of the player, the game is able to reconstruct himself as a 3D character, who can then be dressed up in millions of costume combinations. Reality Fighters was  released for the PlayStation Vita on the system's launch date, February 22, 2012.

On January 23, 2013 the studio released the Invizimals: Hidden Challenges Trading Card App. The free downloadable app available on PS Vita, PSP, iOS, and Android was developed in conjunction with Panini, who released over 470 physical cards in Portugal and Spain. The application allows players to track their physical card collection, play a virtual version of the TCG, and view the monsters in augmented reality.

Shortly after, the studio confirmed that a traditional Invizimals sequel was in development for Vita, with a planned launched in late 2013. The new title had been described as being more ambitious than previous releases, and was released to tie in with the then-upcoming Invizimals animated series from BRB International.

At the end of 2016, Novarama became independent again, separating from Sony Computer Entertainment. At E3 2019, Novarama announced Killsquad, an Action RPG on PC to be released July 16, 2019.

In March 2022, Novarama announced that it had reached a deal with Tencent for the Chinese company to take a stake in Novarama.

Games

Awards
 Invizimals. Special Achievement for Innovation, IGN.com Best of E3 2009, winner.
 Invizimals. Special Achievement for Technological Excellence, IGN.com Best of E3 2009, winner.
 Invizimals. Game of the Show, IGN.com Best of E3 2009, runner-up, lost to LittleBigPlanet.
 Premi Ciutat de Barcelona 2009, Technological Innovation, for Invizimals.
 Invizimals. Best Overall Game. Gamelab Spanish National Video Game Awards 2010, winner.
 Invizimals. Best Technology. Gamelab Spanish National Video Game Awards 2010, winner.
 Invizimals: Shadow Zone. Best Handheld Game. Gamelab Spanish National Video Game Awards 2011, winner.

References

External links
 

Spanish companies established in 2003
Video game companies established in 2003
Video game companies of Spain
Video game development companies
Companies based in Barcelona